La Bandera Roja ('The Red Flag') was a socialist weekly newspaper published from Castro Urdiales, Spain in 1901.

References

1901 establishments in Spain
1901 disestablishments in Spain
Defunct newspapers published in Spain

Publications established in 1901
Publications disestablished in 1901
Spanish-language newspapers
Socialist newspapers
Defunct weekly newspapers